The fifth National Assembly of the Gambia is the legislature of the Gambia, elected at the 2017 parliamentary election and serving until the 2022 parliamentary election.

The 2017 election saw each of the National Assembly's 53 directly-elected constituencies return one NAM, as well as each of the five nominated NAMs being appointed by the President of the Gambia, Adama Barrow. It resulted in an UDP majority of 14 (including nominated members), with 22 opposition NAMs in total.

National Assembly composition 
Below is a graphical representation of the National Assembly following the 2017 election, with 31 UDP NAMs, five APRC NAMs, five NRP NAMs, five GDC NAMs, four PDOIS NAMs, two PPP NAMs, one independent NAM and five nominated NAMs (who are members of the UDP).

Constituency changes 
There was a difference in the number of constituencies between the 2012 and the 2017 elections. In 2015, the Independent Electoral Commission demarcated four constituencies, Kombo North, Kombo Central, Serekunda East, and Serekunda Central, into nine constituencies. Kombo North became Sanneh Menterreng, Old Yundum and Busumbala; Kombo Central became Brikama North and Brikama South; Serekunda East became Tallinding Kunjang and Latrikunda Sabiji; Serekunda Central became Serekunda and Bundungka Kunda.

List of NAMs elected in 2017

References 

Politics of the Gambia
Members of the National Assembly of the Gambia